Beyond Love may refer to:

 Beyond Love (film), 1940 Italian film
 "Beyond Love", song by Beach House from Depression Cherry